Sir Brian Henry Leveson  (born 22 June 1949) is a retired English judge who served as the President of the Queen's Bench Division and Head of Criminal Justice.

Leveson chaired the public inquiry into the culture, practices and ethics of the British press, prompted by the News of the World phone hacking affair.

Early life
Leveson was born in Liverpool, on 22 June 1949. He was educated at Liverpool College, a public school in Mossley Hill, Liverpool. He studied at Merton College, Oxford and was President of the Oxford Law Society.

Legal career
Leveson was called to the Bar at Middle Temple in 1970. He initially practised in Liverpool and took silk in 1986. Leveson became a bencher in 1995, acted as a Recorder between 1988 and 2000, and as a Deputy High Court Judge between 1998 and 2000. In 2000, Leveson was appointed as a Judge of the High Court, Queen's Bench Division, and served as a Presiding Judge of the Northern Circuit between 2002–2005.

In 2006, Leveson was appointed to the new position of Deputy Senior Presiding Judge and, on 2 October 2006, he was appointed a Lord Justice of Appeal. He was promoted to Senior Presiding Judge with effect from 1 January 2007. He was Treasurer of Middle Temple for the year 2020.

Notable cases
In 1989 Leveson was the lead prosecution counsel at the trial of comedian Ken Dodd. Dodd was charged with tax evasion, but was acquitted at Liverpool Crown Court, despite seemingly strong evidence.

Leveson was the lead prosecution counsel during the trial of Rosemary West, who went on to be convicted for the murders of ten young women, including her own eldest daughter, in November 1995. While sitting with Lord Justice Mantell in the Court of Appeal in 2002 under the Lord Chief Justice, Lord Woolf, he upheld the murder conviction of James Hanratty. He also presided over the trial of ex-US Marine Toby Studebaker for charges relating to child grooming over the internet. He sentenced 100-year-old Bernard Heginbotham, who was found guilty of manslaughter of his wife of 67 years, 87-year-old Ida, to a 12-month rehabilitation order. He also presided over the trial of two men who were found guilty in 2005 of murdering Anthony Walker with an axe. He was one of the judges in the appeal of Ruth Ellis in 2003 who said that the appeal was without merit.

In November 2007, the Criminal Division of the Court of Appeal, constituted by the Lord Chief Justice of England and Wales, Lord Phillips of Worth Matravers, Leveson and Mr Justice Simon, quashed the conviction of Barry George and ordered a retrial in relation to the murder in 2001 of BBC presenter Jill Dando. He was appointed a Knight Bachelor in 2000 and sworn as a Privy Counsellor in 2006. On 1 October 2013, Leveson was appointed President of the Queen's Bench Division, succeeding Sir John Thomas.

He was one of three judges who heard an appeal in 2013 by several men who had admitted terrorist offences. One of them, Usman Khan, whose sentence was as a result changed from an "indeterminate sentence" to a "determinate term" of 16 years imprisonment, later committed the 2019 London Bridge stabbing.

Press ethics inquiry and News International phone hacking scandal

It was announced on 13 July 2011 that Leveson would lead the public inquiry into issues of British press culture, practices and ethics raised by the News International phone hacking scandal. On 20 July, Prime Minister David Cameron announced that the scope of the inquiry had widened to include the BBC and social media.

The hearings began on Monday 14 November 2011. The full report was published on 29 November 2012 and is available online.

Later career
In 2013 Leveson was appointed as Chancellor of Liverpool John Moores University, taking over from Brian May, who stepped down at the end of his term.

In 2019, Leveson was appointed as the Investigatory Powers Commissioner, and re-appointed for a further three-year term in October 2022.

Personal life
Leveson and his wife Lynne (daughter of Aubrey Fishel, also from Liverpool) are Jewish. The couple have three children, and live in Hampstead Garden Suburb.

References

External links
The Rt Hon. Lord Justice Leveson Debretts.co.uk
Council members Sentencing Council
Lord Justice Leveson – Speeches Judiciary of England and Wales

Brian Leveson Brian Leveson, collected news and commentary, The Independent

1949 births
Living people
People educated at Liverpool College
Lawyers from Liverpool
Alumni of Merton College, Oxford
English Jews
20th-century English judges
English King's Counsel
Knights Bachelor
Lords Justices of Appeal
Members of the Middle Temple
Members of the Privy Council of the United Kingdom
People associated with Liverpool John Moores University
People associated with the News International phone hacking scandal
Presidents of the Queen's Bench Division
Fellows of Merton College, Oxford
21st-century English judges